Big Brother 2000 is the second season of the Dutch version of Big Brother, was again broadcast by Veronica. It lasted from 14 September till 30 December 2000 for a total of 108 days. The presenters were Beau van Erven Dorens and Esther Duller.

Development
This season still had high ratings but was plagued by mediocre casting which resulted in a programme that rarely sparkled. Big Brother tried to push a romance between Georgie and Kim but it never really took off. Both Jolanda and Leo left prematurely after they had discovered that they had not impressed the public. It seemed they only wanted to use Big Brother as a stepstone to fame and a job on television. Desirée also regularly threatened to leave but never made that threat true. House pet Cindy, a Nubian goat, was removed by Big Brother because the stream-watchers complained that she was not properly cared for.

However, there were some good moments. The irritations around would-be artist Mohammed, Robin who could not hold his liquor, Annette who slept a night in the goat pen and the stolen kisses between housewife Hieke and surfboy Ferdi. Hilarious was the unexpected refusal of the idealistic Ed to leave during the live show. He thought he had been treated unfairly and only agreed to leave the next day, after being allowed to make a public statement.

Housemates

Nominations Table
Housemates nominate for two points (top of the box) and one point (bottom of the box) and the three or more Housemates with the most nomination points face the public vote.

Notes

External links
 World of Big Brother

2000 Dutch television seasons
02